Tri-Cities Airport  (originally Pasco Airport) is a public airport in the northwest United States in Franklin County, Washington.

History
The Tri-Cities Airport (originally Pasco Airport) was the site of the first airmail contract flight between Elko, Nevada, and Pasco, Washington, made by Varney Airlines, (later United Airlines) in 1926. The airport was relocated to its present site and became known as the Franklin County Airport; the U.S. Navy built Naval Air Station Pasco during World War II. After the war, the Navy sold the field to the city of Pasco, but retained training privileges. Several Navy aircraft, especially the P-3 Orion, used the field for landing and take-off training. The Port of Pasco then took ownership in 1963 and opened doors to a new terminal building in 1966.

In 1955, the old administration building became the home of the newly established Columbia Basin College, which it remained until the current facility near Interstate 182 was built in 1966. The building later was leased to the Pasco School District #1, for use as Pasco Alternative High School (now New Horizons High School) until it was destroyed by fire in the mid-1980s. The new school is now sited near Columbia Basin College.

Pasco has had jet flights on several airlines, including Air West/Hughes Airwest with Douglas DC-9s, Cascade Airways with BAC One-Elevens, Delta Air Lines with Boeing 727-200s and 737-300s, Western Airlines with Boeing 727-200s, 737-200s, and 737-300s, Frontier Airlines with 737-200s, Pacific Southwest Airlines (PSA) with BAe 146-200s, Alaska Airlines with Boeing 727s, Horizon Air with Fokker F-28s, and West Coast Airlines with DC-9s.

Currently, scheduled passenger flights are mostly regional jet and turboprop, although Allegiant Air operates Airbus A319s/320s, Delta operates Airbus A319s/320s and Boeing 717s, and Avelo operates Boeing 737s. Horizon Air, a subsidiary of Alaska Airlines, currently uses a mix of Bombardier Q400 turboprop aircraft, and E-175 jets at Tri-Cities, but has announced plans to transition to all E-175 jets by the end of 2023.

An expansion and remodel project took place in 1986 that included access roads, parking lots, aircraft parking apron and more than doubling the size of the terminal.

In 2003, the airport underwent another expansion and remodel that added an additional  to the ticket lobby and boarding area.

In 2014, the Port of Pasco approved a $42 million renovation and expansion, planning to double the size of the terminal. The construction began in August 2014 and finished in January 2017. The first phase of the expansion was completed on September 7, 2015, which included a new west concourse with gates 3, 4 and 5 as well as new car rental and baggage claim areas. The second phase started shortly thereafter, planning to demolish the old boarding area and replace it with a new east concourse to house gates 1 and 2.

On January 27, 2017, the $42 million airport renovation and expansion, which added a new terminal, security area and baggage handling system was officially opened to the public. The new terminal is intended to meet the needs of the Tri-Cities metropolitan area for the next 20 years, with passenger enplanements/deplanements in 2019 reaching a new high of 870,900.

Current use
The airport's terminal at the south end of the field is the property of the Port of Pasco, at the north end of North 20th Avenue. Firefighting, however, is handled by the City of Pasco. A new fire station has recently been built on the terminal grounds. The old Navy station buildings on the north end of the airport are being used by other firms.
 
The airport is undergoing a major resurfacing of the runways, funded by the American Recovery and Reinvestment Act.

Major tenants and commercial activity
General and corporate aviation are important to PSC and they have many facilities to accommodate them. The airport has over 120 based aircraft that belong to business and general aviation operators. T-hangars are available on the airport and two FBOs offer fuel and other services, Bergstrom Aircraft Inc. and Tri-Cities Aviation. The airport has two aircraft sales companies on the field: JD Aircraft Sales and Viper Aircraft Corp; both also offer storage.

PSC also has commercial air traffic. The airport is served by the regional affiliates of several major airlines such as Alaska and United. Delta Air Lines, Avelo Airlines and Allegiant Air operate mainline jets at present. Delta Air Lines flies Skywest E175s as well as Airbus A319s/A320s, Avelo Airlines operates Boeing 737s, with Allegiant Air flying Airbus 320s. Alaska Airlines, operated by Horizon Air, currently flies Bombardier Q400 aircraft on some services being replaced with E175s. Empire Airlines operates FedEx Feeder also to the airport from Spokane Intl (GEG). The FedEx facility on the field goes through  of inbound cargo daily. Empire Airlines usually operates ATR-42s and Cessna 208 Caravans, and also ATR-72s during higher cargo volume periods. The FedEx facility is a major source of revenue for the community and they are planning to expand their facilities at PSC in the near future.

In the year ending December 31, 2018, the airport had 48,211 aircraft operations, average 132 per day: 67% general aviation, 19% air carrier, 9% air taxi, and 5% military. At the time 121 aircraft were based at PSC, 80 single engine, 23 multi engine, 14 jet and 4 helicopter.

Airlines and destinations

Passenger

Cargo

Statistics

Annual traffic

Top destinations

Airline market share

Accidents and incidents
On June 20, 1969, a Beechcraft Model 99 operated by Cascade Airways, bound for Spokane International Airport, pitched up steeply after takeoff, lost control and crashed. The probable causes were the pitch trim was found in the full nose up position and the captain's seat was unlocked and fully aft. Both occupants died.
On December 19, 1989, a British Aerospace Jetstream operated by North Pacific Airlines on behalf of United Express Flight 2415, a domestic scheduled passenger flight inbound from Yakima Air Terminal, crashed on an instrument landing system (ILS) approach to PSC 400 feet short of runway 21. Ice buildup and an unstabilized approach were the probable causes. All four passengers and two crew were killed.
 On September 20, 2022, a Cessna 525B CitationJet CJ3 owned and operated by Pacific Cataract and Laser Institute inbound from Chehalis, WA with 10 people aboard caught fire after landing on runway 03L. As of November 25, 2022, the accident is under investigation, but preliminary information indicates that the plane caught fire after a gear-up landing. All 10 people evacuated and no injuries were reported, but the plane was written off.

References

External links 

 
 WSDOT Pilot's Guide: Tri-Cities
 WSDOT Economic Impacts: Tri-Cities Airport
 
 

Airports in Washington (state)
Tri-Cities, Washington
Pasco, Washington
Transportation buildings and structures in Franklin County, Washington
Airports established in 1926
1926 establishments in Washington (state)